The 1st North-West Legislative Assembly lasted from 1888 to 1891. This Assembly was the third in the history of the Northwest Territories. It marked a huge milestone, bringing responsible government to the territory for the first time.

Background
The 1st Northwest Territories Council was dissolved after reaching the quota of elected members prescribed under the Northwest Territories Act. This precipitated the 1888 Northwest Territories general election.

Despite being an elected body, there were three remaining appointed members left to serve in the Assembly. The three appointees were legal advisers; they could actively participate in debates and move motions, but did not have a vote.

1st Session
The 1st Session of the 1st North-West Legislative Assembly began on October 31, 1888. The festivities began in the morning, with music provided by the North-West Mounted Police Band. The session began at 3:00pm with Lieutenant Governor Joseph Royal entering the chamber escorted by Mounties.

The Council opened by electing the first speaker in Northwest Territories history. Herbert Charles Wilson was nominated in a motion moved by Hugh Cayley. Wilson was acclaimed with the unanimous consent of the Assembly. The election for speaker was decided in a caucus meeting prior to the opening of the Assembly. There were two candidates for speaker presented. The first vote resulted in an 11 to 11 tie between James Ross and Wilson. Ross asked that his name be withdrawn but his supporters refused. After two more tie votes, Ross withdrew and Wilson was acclaimed as the choice for speaker.

The throne speech outlined five main areas of concern. The first was the need for provisions to deal with and prevent prairie fires. The Lieutenant Governor then called for the repeal of the liquor laws passed by the Temporary North-West Council. The speech also announced the introduction of a bill to provide provisions for collecting vital statistics. Royal also reported on the efforts of his legal committee to consolidate the legislation of the Northwest Territories. The last major portion of the speech outlined the upcoming budgetary estimates to be provided to members from the Lieutenant Governor advisory Council.

Members

References

External links
Election Results and Dates 1876 - 1905 from Saskatchewan Archives

001
1888 in Canada
1889 in Canada